Chevan Cordeiro (born October 1, 1999) is an American football quarterback for the San Jose State Spartans. He previously played at the University of Hawaii. A native of Honolulu, Cordeiro has earned the reputation of being the Rainbow Warriors "closer" for his ability to enter games in relief and maintain the lead that the team has built up prior to his appearance in the game or mount a late game comeback.

High school career 
Cordeiro attended Saint Louis School in Honolulu. He was the backup to Tua Tagovailoa, and wasn't named the starting quarterback until his senior year as a result. In his lone season as the starter, Cordeiro accumulated over 3,000 total yards and 39 touchdowns en route to a perfect 10–0 record and an Open Division state title. He was also named the state's Gatorade Hawaii Football Player of the Year as well as the Star-Advertiser's Offensive Player of the Year.

Cordeiro's recruiting process was tame compared to his predecessor Tagovailoa, as he committed to playing college football at Hawaii, the only offer he received.

College career

Hawaii

2018
Cordeiro made his first career start in 2018 against Wyoming, replacing the injured Cole McDonald. He threw 19 of 29 passes for 148 yards, two touchdowns and an interception that was returned for a touchdown in a 17–13 win that saw Hawaii reclaim the Paniolo Trophy. He also appeared in games against Nevada, UNLV, and Louisiana Tech.

In his appearance versus UNLV, Cordeiro threw for three touchdowns on four completed passes to lead Hawaii to a 35–28 victory. Down 28–13 in the fourth quarter, Cordeiro came off the bench to replace a struggling McDonald and threw for 153 yards, three touchdowns on 4 of 5 passes. The win was Hawaii's seventh of the season, clinching a bid in the Hawaii Bowl.

Cordeiro also appeared in the team's bowl game against Louisiana Tech in an attempt to spark the Hawaii offense, failing to do so as Hawaii scored a season low 14 points in the 31–14 loss.

Under the newly changed NCAA redshirt policy, Cordeiro was able to play in four games and redshirt to keep an extra year of eligibility after the 2018 season.

2019
In his redshirt freshman season, Cordeiro appeared in 12 of Hawaii's 15 games. He made his 2019 debut in a nationally televised Week 0 game against Arizona, replacing McDonald who had four interceptions despite throwing for four touchdowns as well. Cordeiro threw for 58 yards and a touchdown, adding 34 rushing yards. He made his first start of the season against San Jose State, completing 23 of 31 passes for 309 yards and three touchdowns, also accounting for 55 rushing yards and two touchdowns in a 42–40 win. For his efforts in the win, Cordeiro was named the Mountain West offensive player of the week.

2020
With McDonald departing Hawaii to declare for the 2020 NFL Draft, Cordeiro was considered the favorite to win the starting quarterback job for the Rainbow Warriors. He was officially named the starting quarterback for the team's first game against Fresno State on October 19. Cordeiro finished the season with a 5-4 record while completing 2,083 passing yards and 14 touchdowns, while also leading Hawaii in rushing yards (483) and touchdowns (7).

2021
Cordeiro entered 2021 as the starting quarterback once again, and was named a team captain by his peers. Cordeiro missed three games due to a shoulder injury, returning to the starting lineup against Utah State. He would go 2-3 on his last 5 games capping with a 38-14 win over Wyoming for the Paniolo Trophy.

On December 1, 2021, Cordeiro announced via social media that he would be transferring from Hawaii. On December 11, Cordeiro announced he would transfer to San Jose State. He has two years of eligibility remaining.

San Jose State

2022
Cordeiro was expected to earn the starting job but competed with Nick Nash in the spring and preseason. He was officially named to the team's starting lineup. 

On September 1, in a season opener against Portland State, Cordeiro completed 15 of 30 passes for 239 yards and one touchdown while running for two more on the ground as he rallies for a 21-17 victory; Cordeiro's first win as a Spartan. The team's first setback came against Auburn on September 10. In the 24-16 loss, Cordeiro passed for 275 yards on 60% of his passes to go along with 13 carries and 23 rushing yards. Throughout the season, Cordeiro would eventually lead the Spartans to a 7-4 record in his first year as starter capping with a 27-14 victory against his former team Hawaii & solidifying their bowl eligibility. On December 20, Cordeiro & the Spartans faced Eastern Michigan in the Famous Idaho Potato Bowl. Despite building an early 13-0 lead, the Spartans were unable to sustain momentum the rest of the way and lost to the Eagles; 41-27.

Statistics

References

External links 
 
 
 Hawaii Rainbow Warriors profile

1999 births
Living people
Hawaii people of Portuguese descent
Players of American football from Honolulu
American football quarterbacks
Saint Louis School alumni
Hawaii Rainbow Warriors football players
San Jose State Spartans football players